The alcohol industry is the segment of the commercial drink industry that is involved in the manufacturing, distribution, and sale of alcoholic beverages.

Criticism
The industry has been criticised in the 1990s for deflecting attention away from the problems associated with alcohol use. The alcohol industry has also been criticised for being unhelpful in reducing the harm of alcohol.

The World Bank works with and invests in alcohol industry projects when positive effects with regard to public health concerns and social policy are demonstrated. Alcohol industry-sponsored education to reduce the harm of alcohol, actually results in an increase in the harm of alcohol. As a result, it has been recommended that the alcohol industry does not become involved in alcohol policy or educational programs.

In the United Kingdom, the New Labour government took the view that working with the alcohol industry to reduce harm was the most effective strategy. However, alcohol-related harms and alcohol use disorders have increased. The alcohol industry has been accused of exaggerating the health benefits of alcohol which is regarded as a potentially dangerous recreational drug with potentially serious adverse effects on health.

Since ethanol is classified as a Class I carcinogen, and there is no safe dose of alcohol; the alcohol industry is considered one of the main contributors to the formation of civilization or lifestyle diseases. The alcohol industry has tried to actively mislead the public about the risk of cancer due to alcohol consumption, in addition to campaigning to remove laws that require alcoholic beverages to have cancer warning labels.

See also
Alcohol use disorder
Alcohol advertising
Alcohol education
Alcohol and health
Short-term effects of alcohol consumption
Long-term effects of alcohol consumption
Temperance movement

References

 
Industries (economics)